Melaleuca groveana, commonly known as Grove's paperbark is a plant in the myrtle family Myrtaceae and is endemic to New South Wales and Queensland in Australia. It is an uncommon species with relatively large heads of white flowers in spring, the styles of which are significantly longer than the stamens.

Description
The leaves have a distinct midvein and several lateral veins.

The stamens are arranged in five bundles around the flower and there are 11 to 26 stamens in each bundle. Flowering occurs in early spring but the flowers are relatively short-lived.

Taxonomy and naming
Melaleuca groveana was first formally described in 1925 by Edwin Cheel and Cyril Tenison White in Proceedings of the Royal Society of Queensland. The specific epithet (groveana) honours C.H. Grove, a Queensland clergyman and the collector of the type specimen.

Distribution and habitat
Melaleuca groveana has a fragmented distribution from the Port Stephens district in New South Wales to the Bluff district in Queensland. It grows in heath and woodland with a heathy understorey, usually in higher areas, often in exposed sites on rocky ridges and outcrops and sometimes on low hills near the coast.

Ecology
Some coastal populations of Grove's paperbark are under threat from competition with the introduced weed bitou bush (Chrysanthemoides monilifera).

Conservation status
This species is classified as "vulnerable" in New South Wales and "near threatened" in Queensland. It is listed as "rare" in the 1997 IUCN red book of threatened plants.

Uses

Horticulture
Melaleuca groveana is a hardy species, easily propagated from seed and suitable as a screening plant. Unlike most melaleucas, after initial establishment it is relatively drought resistant plant.

References

groveana
Myrtales of Australia
Flora of New South Wales
Flora of Queensland
Plants described in 1925
Taxa named by Edwin Cheel
Taxa named by Cyril Tenison White